The 2014 World Karate Championships were the 22nd edition of the World Karate Championships, and were held in Bremen, Germany from November 5 to November 9, 2014.

Medalists

Men

Women

Medal table

Participating nations 
887 athletes from 116 nations competed.

 (4)
 (10)
 (5)
 (2)
 (7)
 (10)
 (12)
 (2)
 (12)
 (11)
 (1)
 (1)
 (12)
 (6)
 (15)
 (7)
 (14)
 (4)
 (13)
 (11)
 (4)
 (11)
 (6)
 (16)
 (4)
 (2)
 (10)
 (12)
 (12)
 (6)
 (16)
 (2)
 (14)
 (4)
 (2)
 (10)
 (16)
 (6)
 (5)
 (15)
 (12)
 (6)
 (2)
 (13)
 (14)
 (4)
 (14)
 (5)
 (16)
 (7)
 (10)
 (7)
 (13)
 (16)
 (3)
 (13)
 (7)
 (7)
 (2)
 (7)
 (8)
 (9)
 (2)
 (9)
 (2)
 (9)
 (2)
 (8)
 (8)
 (1)
 (7)
 (8)
 (9)
 (2)
 (1)
 (4)
 (1)
 (1)
 (3)
 (11)
 (4)
 (13)
 (6)
 (4)
 (14)
 (15)
 (3)
 (2)
 (7)
 (5)
 (1)
 (14)
 (1)
 (11)
 (11)
 (13)
 (10)
 (16)
 (1)
 (4)
 (9)
 (1)
 (1)
 (1)
 (12)
 (16)
 (12)
 (7)
 (16)
 (1)
 (11)
 (15)
 (2)
 (11)
 (1)
 (1)

References

External links
 World Karate Federation
 Official website
 Results

World Championships
World Karate Championships
World Karate Championships
Karate Championships
Karate competitions in Germany
Sport in Bremen (city)
November 2014 sports events in Germany